Magnesium nitrate refers to inorganic compounds  with the formula Mg(NO3)2(H2O)x, where x = 6, 2, and 0.  All are white solids.  The anhydrous material is hygroscopic, quickly forming the hexahydrate upon standing in air. All of the salts are very soluble in both water and ethanol.

Occurrence, preparation, structure
Being highly water soluble, magnesium nitrate occurs naturally only in mines and caverns as nitromagnesite (hexahydrate form). 

The magnesium nitrate used in commerce is made by the reaction of nitric acid and various magnesium salts.

Use

The principal use is as a dehydrating agent in the preparation of concentrated nitric acid.

Its fertilizer grade has 10.5% nitrogen and 9.4% magnesium, so it is listed as 10.5-0-0 + 9.4% Mg. Fertilizer blends containing magnesium nitrate also have ammonium nitrate, calcium nitrate, potassium nitrate and micronutrients in most cases; these blends are used in the greenhouse and hydroponics trade.

Reactions
Magnesium nitrate reacts with alkali metal hydroxide to form the corresponding nitrate:

 Mg(NO3)2 + 2 NaOH →  Mg(OH)2 + 2 NaNO3.

Since magnesium nitrate has a high affinity for water, heating the hexahydrate does not result in the dehydration of the salt, but rather its decomposition into magnesium oxide, oxygen, and nitrogen oxides:
2 Mg(NO3)2 → 2 MgO + 4 NO2 + O2.
The absorption of these nitrogen oxides in water is one possible route to synthesize nitric acid. Although inefficient, this method does not require the use of any strong acid.

It is also occasionally used as a desiccant.

References

Liquid Chemistry
Nitromagnesite Mineral Data
Magnesium Nitrate MSDS

Magnesium compounds
Nitrates
Oxidizing agents